HMS Castor was one of the Cambrian subclass of the  of light cruisers. She saw service during the First World War and the Russian Civil War.

Construction

Castor was built by Cammell Laird at Birkenhead, England. Laid down on 28 October 1914, she was launched on 28 July 1915 and completed in November 1915.

Service history

World War I

Commissioned in November 1915, Castor was the flagship of Commodore (D), assigned to the 11th Destroyer Flotilla in the Grand Fleet. She fought in the Battle of Jutland, in which she was damaged by German gunfire and suffered 10 casualties.

On 4 October 1917, the United States Navy patrol vessel  suffered an uncontrollable leak in her hull while on patrol duty off France. Rehoboths crew had to be taken off, and Castor sank her with gunfire.

Post-war
After the First World War, Castor served in the Black Sea from 1919 to 1920 during the British intervention in the Russian Civil War. In April 1920, she recommissioned at Chatham Dockyard for service in the 2nd Light Cruiser Squadron in the Atlantic Fleet.

The ships crossed the North Sea and transited the Kaiser Wilhelm Canal to enter the Baltic, where they called at Danzig in the Free City of Danzig; Memel in the Klaipėda Region; Liepāja, Latvia; Riga, Latvia; Tallinn, Estonia; Helsinki, Finland; Stockholm, Sweden; Copenhagen, Denmark; Gothenburg, Sweden; and Kristiania, Norway, before crossing the North Sea and ending the voyage at Port Edgar, Scotland, on 15 October 1921.

Castor patrolled off the coast of Ireland in 1922 during the Irish Civil War. She was assigned to the Gunnery School at Portsmouth from 1923 to 1924, then was in the Nore Reserve from 1924 to 1925.

Castor underwent a refit from November 1925 to September 1926, then began transporting troops to China in October 1927. She recommissioned at Devonport in June 1928 to serve on the China Station. She entered the Devonport Reserve in July 1930, then was decommissioned in May 1935.

Disposal
Castor was sold on 30 July 1936 for scrapping and arrived at the shipbreakers yard at Rosyth in August 1936.

Notes

References

External links 
 Cambrian Class Light Cruisers
  Transcription of ship's logbooks November 1918 to May 1920
 Battle of Jutland Crew Lists Project - HMS Castor Crew List

 

C-class cruisers
Ships built on the River Mersey
1915 ships
World War I cruisers of the United Kingdom